John Yates (3 January 1861 – 1 June 1917) was an English footballer who won the FA Cup with Blackburn Olympic in 1883 and made one appearance for England in 1889 playing on the left wing.

Early career
Yates was born in Blackburn but started his football career with Accrington in 1879. After a year, he joined Blackburn Olympic and was part of the team of tradesmen and weavers who achieved a small level of success in the 1880s, backed by local iron foundry owner Sid Yates and coached by former England player Jack Hunter. Their greatest success came when they overcame the dominance of local rivals, Blackburn Rovers, and the amateur teams of southern England to win the FA Cup in 1883.

Yates returned to Accrington in February 1886, and spent a further two years with the club before joining Burnley in 1888.

1888-1889
Yates made his League debut on 8 September 1888, playing as a winger, at Deepdale, home of Preston North End. The home team defeated Burnley 5–2. Jack Yates scored his League debut on 27 October 1888, playing as a winger, at Trent Bridge, then home of Notts County. The home side defeated Burnley 6–1, Jack Yates scoring Burnley' solitary goal. Jack Yates appeared in 21 of the 22 League matches played by Burnley in season 1888–89 scoring five League goals. As a winger (21 appearances) he played in a midfield that achieved big (three–League–goals–or–more) on two separate occasions. Jack Yates' five League goals included two–in–a–match once.

International career
Yates had previously represented Lancashire on many occasions, and received his solitary England cap for the match against Ireland played at Anfield, Liverpool on 2 March 1889, thus becoming Burnley's first England international. England won the match "quite comfortably" 6–1, with Yates scoring a hat trick. Despite this, he was not selected for the match against Scotland six weeks later. He is one of five players to have scored a hat-trick on his England debut, yet not make a second appearance.

He continued to make sporadic appearances for Burnley over the next few years, before retiring from playing in 1894, returning to his profession of cotton weaver.

During his later years he was landlord of the Brickmakers' Arms, a pub near to the Turf Moor ground in Burnley. He died of cancer on 1 June 1917.

Honours
Blackburn Olympic
FA Cup winners: 1883

References

External links

England profile

1861 births
1917 deaths
Footballers from Blackburn
English footballers
England international footballers
Blackburn Olympic F.C. players
Accrington F.C. players
Burnley F.C. players
Deaths from cancer in England
English Football League players
Association football forwards
FA Cup Final players